The Tanaostigmatidae are a small family of parasitic wasps in the superfamily Chalcidoidea. They are almost exclusively phytophagous insects, forming galls in plant stems, leaves, or seeds. The some 90 species in 9 genera are primarily tropical and subtropical.

They are typically short, squat wasps, best recognized by a protruding prepectus, and the mesonotum is often strongly arched, so the pronotum is nearly vertical.

External links
Universal Chalcidoidea Database

Chalcidoidea
Apocrita families